Coatepeque may refer to:

Coatepeque, Santa Ana, El Salvador
Coatepeque Caldera, El Salvador
Coatepeque, Quetzaltenango, Guatemala